The 94th Illinois General Assembly, consisting of the Illinois Senate and the Illinois House of Representatives, existed from January 12, 2005 to January 9, 2007 during the first two years of Rod Blagojevich's second term as governor. The General Assembly met at the Illinois State Capitol.

During the 94th General Assembly, the Senate was in session for 119 legislative days, and the House was in session for 143 legislative days. There were no special sessions.

All 118 members of the House, and 23 of the 59 members of the Senate, were elected in the 2004 election. The apportionment of seats was based on the 2000 census. Both chambers had a Democratic majority. 

The 94th General Assembly was followed by the 95th General Assembly in January 2007.

Legislation 

The 94th General Assembly enacted a total of 1,113 bills into law.

Early in the session, the General Assembly passed an amendment to the Illinois Human Rights Act to prohibit discrimination on the basis of sexual orientation. The governor signed the amendment into law on January 21, 2005.

Prompted by a series of high-profile dog bite incidents, in 2006 the legislature passed three measures imposing penalties on the owners of dangerous dogs or those involved in dog fighting. Among these was the first law in the country to prohibit certain felons, including those convicted of forcible felonies, from owning dogs that have not been spayed or neutered. The governor signed all three measures into law on May 31, 2006.

The Methamphetamine Precursor Control Act was signed into law on November 16, 2005, and took effect on January 15, 2006.  The MPCA required that people present identification in order to purchase cold medication that contains pseudoephedrine (Sudafed, Tylenol Cold and Claritin D), which could be used to produce methamphetamine.

In 2006, the legislature passed an amendment to the Illinois Minimum Wage Law that allowed employees to receive punitive damages when they sue an employer for unpaid wages. This change was brought on by a 2005 Illinois Court of Appeals ruling that punitive damages were only available in cases brought by the state Department of Labor. The same bill also amended the Illinois Wage Payment and Collection Act to restore a penalty of 1% per day for employers who fail to pay wages due after receiving a demand from the Department of Labor. The bill was signed into law on July 14, 2006.

Senate 

Under the 1970 Illinois Constitution, the Illinois Senate has 59 members, who serve overlapping two- and four-year terms. Thirty votes are required for a majority, and 36 votes (or 60%) are required to override a veto or propose a constitutional amendment.

Of the 23 members elected in the 2004 election, 20 were elected to four-year terms, and three were elected to two-year terms. 

Three new members joined the chamber at the outset: two by election and one (Kwame Raoul) by appointment to fill the seat of Barack Obama, who had been elected to the US Senate. Five members who had previously been appointed were elected in 2006 for the first time. The remaining 51 members were returning incumbents, either re-elected or continuing the second half of a four-year term.

Senate leadership

Party composition 

The Senate of the 94th General Assembly consisted of 31 Democrats, 27 Republicans, and one Independent. One seat changed from Democratic to Republican hands in the 2004 Illinois Senate election, reducing the Democratic majority in the preceding 93rd Senate by one.

The independent Senator, James T. Meeks of Chicago, caucused with the Democrats. He had been elected in 2002 on the Honesty and Integrity Party ticket.

State Senators

House 

The Illinois House has 118 members who are elected every two years. The composition of the 94th House reflects the results of the 2004 election, in which three seats changed from Democratic to Republican, and two seats changed from Republican to Democratic, resulting in a reduced 65–53 Democratic majority. Seven new members joined the chamber, and nine who had previously been appointed to fill vacancies were elected for the first time. 102 House incumbents were re-elected.

House leadership

Party composition 

The 94th House consisted of 65 Democrats and 53 Republicans.

State Representatives

See also 
109th United States Congress
List of Illinois state legislatures

Works cited 

Legislative Districts of Illinois
Legislators' Portraits and Biographies

References

External links 
Official site

2005 in Illinois
2006 in Illinois
Illinois legislative sessions
2005 U.S. legislative sessions
2006 U.S. legislative sessions